In mathematics, any integrable function  can be made into a periodic function  with period P by summing the translations of the function  by integer multiples of P. This is called periodic summation: 

That identity is a form of the Poisson summation formula.

The periodic summation of a Dirac delta function is the Dirac comb. Likewise, the periodic summation of an integrable function is its convolution with the Dirac comb.

Quotient space as domain 

If a periodic function is instead represented using the quotient space domain
 then one can write:

Citations

See also 
Dirac comb
Circular convolution
Discrete-time Fourier transform

Functions and mappings  
Signal processing